The 2007–08 season was the 1st season in the Football League played by Dagenham & Redbridge F.C., an English football club based in Dagenham, Greater London. It was their first consecutive season in Football League Two after promotion from Football Conference in 2007. The season covers the period from 1 July 2007 to 30 June 2008.

Match results
League positions are sourced from Statto, while the remaining contents of each table are sourced from the references in the "Ref" column.

League Two

FA Cup

League Cup

Football League Trophy

Player details

Numbers in parentheses denote appearances as substitute.

Footnotes

A.  Dagenham & Redbridge won 7–6 on penalties following a 2–2 draw after 90 minutes.

References

Dagenham and Redbridge
Dagenham & Redbridge F.C. seasons